The Eichbach, also called Eiche, is a river of Thuringia, Germany.

It is a left tributary of the Hahle in the thuringian district Eichsfeld.

Course

The Eichbach springs between Steinbach and Hundeshagen in an area of predominantly agricultural use. It flows in a northerly direction. Shortly before Teistungen it incorporates the Finkgraben and another unnamed brook from Berlingerode. After flowing through Teistungen, at the northern development boundary it flows into the Hahle, a tributary of the Rhume.

See also
List of rivers of Thuringia

Rivers of Thuringia
Rivers of Germany